Kentchurch Court is a Grade I listed stately home  east from the village of Kentchurch in Herefordshire, England.

History 
It is the family home of the Scudamore family. Family members included Sir John Scudamore, who acted as constable and steward of a number of royal castles in south Wales at the start of the 15th century.  He secretly married Alys, one of the daughters of Owain Glyndŵr, in 1410, and it has been suggested that the couple may have harboured Glyndŵr himself at Kentchurch after his disappearance around 1412, until his death.

Kentchurch Court has been used as a filming location for several films and television series including The Vault of Horror, On the Black Hill and Regency House Party. In 2011, it was the subject of a documentary presented by hotelier Ruth Watson as part of her Country House Rescue series.

See also
 Grade I listed buildings in Herefordshire
 List of country houses in the United Kingdom

References

External links
 Kentchurch Court homepage

Country houses in Herefordshire
Grade I listed buildings in Herefordshire